The 2017–18 Regional Super50 was the 44th edition of the Regional Super50, the domestic limited-overs cricket competition for the countries of the West Indies Cricket Board (WICB). The tournament started on 31 January 2018 and finished on 24 February 2018. Barbados were the defending champions.

In September 2017, two English county sides, Kent and Hampshire, were invited to take part in the competition. Kent took part in the previous edition of the tournament. In January 2018, the United States national cricket team accepted an invite to join the tournament. They were joined by the six regular teams of West Indian domestic cricket (Barbados, Guyana, Jamaica, the Leeward Islands, Trinidad and Tobago, and the Windward Islands) and the Combined Campuses and Colleges team.

Following the conclusion of the group stage, Barbados and the Windward Islands from Group A, and Guyana and Kent from Group B had progressed to the finals. In the first semi-final, Barbados beat Kent by 13 runs in a rain-affected match, after Kraigg Brathwaite scored an unbeaten century. The second semi-final was also rain-affected, with the Windward Islands beating Guyana by 52 runs, with Tyrone Theophile scoring his first century in List A cricket.

The Windward Islands won the tournament, beating the defending champions Barbados by three wickets in the final.

Squads

Points tables
In the group stage of the tournament four points were awarded for each match a team won, with two points awarded to both teams if a match ends in a tie or if there is no result declared. A bonus point was awarded to a team if they won a match with a run rate of 1.25 greater than that of the opposition team.

Group A

Group B

The top two teams from each group qualified for the playoff stage of the tournament.

Fixtures

Group A

Group B

Finals

References

External links
 Series home at ESPN Cricinfo

2018 in West Indian cricket
Regional Super50
Regional Super50 seasons